Ahmed Husayn Khudayir as-Samarrai (born July 2, 1941) was Prime Minister of Iraq from 1993 to 1994, during the rule of President Saddam Hussein.

He surrendered to the U.S. forces during the 2003 invasion of Iraq. Later on, he was sentenced in 2006.

References

1941 births
Living people
Prime Ministers of Iraq
Finance ministers of Iraq
Arab Socialist Ba'ath Party – Iraq Region politicians